Vanoverberghia is a genus of plants in the Zingiberaceae, named after Morice Vanoverbergh (1885–1982), a Catholic missionary priest who lived in the Philippines and was also an anthropologist and a linguist.

The genus has now have five  known species, native to Taiwan and the Philippines.

Vanoverberghia sasakiana Funak. & H.Ohashi - Taiwan (Lanyu Island, also called Orchid Island) and Philippines
Vanoverberghia sepulchrei Merr. - Philippines
Vanoverberghia (Alpinia) diversifolia Elmer - Luzon, Philippines
Vanoverberghia rubrobracteata  Docot & Ambida - Philippines
Vanoverberghia (Alpinia) vanoverberghii (Merr.) Funak. & Docot - Philippines

References

External links
Smithsonian National Museum of Natural History, Genera of the Zingiberales, Vanoverberghia 
Phytoimages, Vanoverberghia sepulchrei 

Alpinioideae
Zingiberaceae genera
Taxa named by Elmer Drew Merrill